Tsuga forrestii is a species of conifer in the family Pinaceae. It is considered as a variety of Tsuga chinensis (i.e., T. c. var. forrestii) by some.

While not a target species, Tsuga forrestii is threatened by clear-cutting of mixed forests.

References

forrestii
Vulnerable plants
Trees of China
Endemic flora of China
Flora of Guizhou
Flora of Sichuan
Flora of Yunnan
Taxonomy articles created by Polbot